Man Seeking Woman is an American television sitcom that premiered on FXX on January 14, 2015. The series is about a naïve and soft-spoken man in his 20s named Josh Greenberg (played by Jay Baruchel), who finds himself in several surreal and awkward circumstances while trying to find love. On April 4, 2017, the show was canceled.

Series overview

Episodes

Season 1 (2015)

Season 2 (2016)

Season 3 (2017)

References

External links
 

Lists of American sitcom episodes